Saiburi may refer to:
Syburi or Saiburi Province, a Thai province after the annexation of northern Malay states in 1943 - 1945.
Saiburi, the Thai name for the Malay state of Kedah.
Sai Buri District, a district in Pattani Province.